Dealer is a 2021 French streaming television series created by Ange Basterga and Nicolas Lopez that premiered on Netflix on 10 March 2021. The series consists of 10 episodes

Synopsis
Tony is a young rapper and cannabis dealer in a city in southern France. The label of his record company sends him a director, Franck and a cameraman, Thomas, to shoot a clip. The two men become witnesses to a gang war.

Cast and characters
 Abderamane Diakhite as Tony
 Mohamed Boudouh as Moussa
 Sébastien Houbani as Franck
 Idir Azougli as Steve
 Julien Meurice as Thomas
 Abdillah Assoumani as Mabs
 Mohamed Souare as Kylian
 Yvan Sorel as Blanche Neige
 Jean-Toussaint Bernard as the voice of Thomas
 Alexy Brun as Alex
 Nazim Kaabeche as Zimo
 Romain Vissol as the voice of Bruno du label
 Siti Hamadi as Jess
 Houda Salhi as Houda
 Kilian Da Costa as Kilian
 Jafar Moughanim as Ahmed

Episodes

Production 
Nicolas Lopez, originally from the city of Martigues, and Ange Basterga, a Corsican who grew up in Seine-Saint-Denis, invested all their savings to write, direct and self-produce the film Caïd in 2017. The film was only entitled to 4 days of shooting with non-professional actors. Caïd won the prize for Best Feature Film at the Festival Polar de Cognac. The production company FrenchKiss Pictures and Netflix decided to make a series. The two directors rewrote the story with Nicolas Peufaillit (A Prophet by Jacques Audiard) in 10 episodes of 10 minutes. They shot again in Martigues in 2020 with the same crew of actors with a found footage technique.

References

External links

 
 

2021 French television series debuts
French-language Netflix original programming
Television shows set in France
French action adventure television series